The 2019 Under-21 Provincial Championship was the 2019 edition of the Under-21 Provincial Championship, an annual national Under-21 rugby union competition held in South Africa, and was contested from 21 June to 7 September 2019.

Competition rules and information

There were six participating teams in the 2019 Under-21 Provincial Championship. Each team played the other five teams twice during the pool stage, once at home and once away. Teams received four points for a win and two points for a draw. Bonus points were awarded to teams that scored four or more tries in a game, as well as to teams that lost a match by seven points or less. Teams were ranked by log points, then points difference (points scored less points conceded).

The top four teams in the pool stage qualified for the semi-finals, where the top-placed team hosted the fourth-placed team, and the second-placed team hosted the third-placed team. The two semi-final winners played in the final, played as a curtain-raiser for the 2019 Currie Cup Premier Division final.

Teams

The teams that competed in the 2019 Under-21 Provincial Championship are:

Regular season

Standings

The final standings in the 2019 Under-21 Provincial Championship were:

Round-by-round

The table below shows each team's progression throughout the season. For each round, each team's cumulative points total is shown with the overall log position in brackets.

Matches

The following matches were played in the 2019 Under-21 Provincial Championship regular season:

Round one

Round two

Round three

Round four

Round Five

Round Six

Round Seven

Round Eight

Round Nine

Round Ten

Play-offs

Semi-finals

Final

Honours

The honour roll for the 2019 Under-21 Provincial Championship was:

Players

The squads and player appearance and scoring statistics for the 2019 Under-21 Provincial Championship are as follows:

(c) denotes the team captain. For each match, the player's squad number is shown. Starting players are numbered 1 to 15, while the replacements are numbered 16 to 23. "App" refers to the number of appearances made by the player, "Try" to the number of tries scored by the player, "Con" to the number of conversions kicked, "Pen" to the number of penalties kicked, "DG" to the number of drop goals kicked and "Pts" refer to the total number of points scored by the player.

Referees

The following referees officiated matches in the 2019 Under-21 Provincial Championship:

See also

 2019 Currie Cup Premier Division
 2019 Currie Cup First Division
 2019 Rugby Challenge

References

External links
 SARU website

2019 in South African rugby union
2019 rugby union tournaments for clubs
2019